Antonios Keramopoulos (Vlasti, 1870 – Athens, 13 May 1960) was a Greek archaeologist. He conducted numerous excavations studying Mycenean and classical Greek antiquities during the early 20th century, including excavations at the Agora of Athens, the palace of Mycenae and at Thebes. He also wrote studies about later Greek history. Among other things, he became known as a proponent of the theory of an autochthonous Greek origin of the Vlachs in Greece.

References

Keramopoulos, Antonios
Mycenaean archaeologists
Greek numismatists
1870 births
1960 deaths
People from Vlasti
Members of the Academy of Athens (modern)